Eagles Greatest Hits Volume 2 is the second compilation album by the Eagles. It features many of their biggest hits not on Their Greatest Hits (1971–1975), including "Hotel California", their signature song. The album was released in 1982, after the band's breakup. That same year, Don Henley and Glenn Frey both released their debut solo albums.

The compilation features eight combined tracks from Hotel California and The Long Run. Also included is "After the Thrill Is Gone", an album track from One of These Nights. (That song, with its title that summed up the state of the band at the time, was strategically placed as the last track on Eagles Greatest Hits Volume 2.) "Seven Bridges Road", the single from 1980's Eagles Live, rounds out the album, which has sold over 11 million copies in the U.S. since its release.

Track listing

Personnel
Don Felder – vocals, guitars
Glenn Frey – vocals, guitars, keyboards
Don Henley – vocals, drums, percussion
Bernie Leadon – vocals, pedal steel guitar (uncredited; "After the Thrill Is Gone" only)
Randy Meisner – vocals, bass guitar ("Hotel California", "Victim of Love", "Life in the Fast Lane", "New Kid in Town", "After the Thrill Is Gone" only)
Timothy B. Schmit – vocals, bass guitar
Joe Walsh – vocals, guitars, keyboards (except "After the Thrill is Gone")

Charts

Certifications

See also
List of best-selling albums in the United States

References

1982 greatest hits albums
Eagles (band) compilation albums
Albums produced by Bill Szymczyk
Asylum Records compilation albums
Elektra Records compilation albums